Balangan may refer to:

Balangan Beach, a surfing beach in Bali
Balangan Regency in South Kalimantan
Balangan-e Olya, a village in Rostam-e Do Rural District, Iran